Martin Curtis is a leading New Zealand folksinger and songwriter.

Biography
Born in Great Britain on 7 February 1944, he came to New Zealand in 1964. In 1976, he and his wife Kay went to Wānaka in Central Otago in the South Island to manage a youth hostel in the town for two weeks. They loved the place, and stayed. They now live in the Cardrona Valley, near Wānaka. His love of the area is reflected in the large number of songs he has written about the district.

Martin runs the annual Cardrona Folk Festival that takes place every Labour Weekend. (New Zealand's Labour Day falls on the 4th Monday of October.) He is also responsible for organising tours of New Zealand by top folk musicians, mainly from Britain, but including Eric Bogle from Australia and Jeremy Taylor from South Africa.

He has produced a number of albums. His 1982 debut album, Gin and Raspberry, is recognised by the New Zealand Recording Industry Association as the best-selling New Zealand folk music album. His 2008 album Sea to Summit was one of three contenders for the 2009 Tui Award for the best New Zealand folk music album of the year.

Discography
1982: Gin and Raspberry

1986: Back from the Hills

1990: The Daisy Patch

1994: Save the Wilderness

1996: Off to the Dry Cardrona

1998: Below the High Country

2000: Let's Sing a Kiwi Song (children's album)

2002: Beyond a Climber's Moon

2004: Otago, My Home (DVD)

2008: Sea to Summit

See also
List of folk musicians

External links
Martin Curtis Home Page: http://www.martincurtis.co.nz/

Cardrona Folk Festival: http://www.martincurtis.co.nz/cardrona.html

References
Folk musician's chance for glory, p. 48, Otago Daily Times, 24 Jan 2009

1944 births
Living people
New Zealand musicians
People from Wānaka